Wallaceodoxa is a genus of palm (family Arecaceae), in the subtribe Ptychospermatinae. It has only one currently accepted species, Wallaceodoxa raja-ampat, native to the Raja Ampat Islands off the Bird's Head Peninsula of New Guinea. It grows on limestone soils.

References

Ptychospermatinae
Monotypic Arecaceae genera
Endemic flora of Western New Guinea
Plants described in 2014